The , also known as the , is a line of text printed on a book's copyright page (often the verso of the title page, especially in English-language publishing) used to indicate the print run of the particular edition. Publishers began this convention about the middle of the  its use became common after 1970.

An example follows:

This is how the printer's key will appear in the first print run of a book. Numbers are removed with subsequent printings, so if "1" is seen then the book is the first printing of that edition. If it is the second printing then the "1" is removed, meaning that the lowest number seen will be "2".

Examples

Usually, the printer's key is a series of numbers or letters. However its structure or presentation is not uniform, as shown in the following examples:

In some cases, rather than follow in series, the numbers may alternate from left to right. For example:

In other cases, number lines may include a date line:

This indicates a second printing (or ) and that it occurred in 1970. More specifically, it is this particular imprint's second impression of the edition.

When the publisher outsources the printing to a contractor, a code identifying the contracting printer may occasionally be shown:

The hypothetical printer's key above means
 third printing
 printed in 1996
 contracted to Acme Printing Corporation.

First edition vs. first printing

Bibliographers usually define a first edition as all printings from substantially the same type setting, no matter how many printings are done. Book collectors tend to define first edition as the first printing of the first edition.

Why numbers are removed rather than added

With each successive reprint, the publisher needs to instruct the printer to change the impression number. In practice, if the plates (in offset printing) have been kept, a number can be erased, but nothing can be added. In this arrangement, all the printer must do is "rub off" the last number in sequence. Changing only the outer number requires the fewest possible changes to the page of characters, which means the smallest possible charge to the publisher. In the days of letterpress printing, where each character was a metal block, all the printer had to do was to pick out the relevant blocks from the "sheet"; then the stack of blocks, which had been laboriously laid out when the page was first set up, could be inked for the reprint. In the case of a Linotype slug, the lowest number could be filed off and the slug reused. For offset printing with metal plates, the number can be erased without damaging the rest of the plate. In each case, the change is minimal.

Notes

References

 
 
 
 
 
 
 
 
 

Book design
Typesetting